is a railway station on the Hokuriku Main Line in the town of Minamiechizen, Fukui Prefecture, Japan, operated by the West Japan Railway Company (JR West).

Lines

Station layout
The station consists of two unnumbered opposed side platform connected by an underground passage. The station is staffed.

Platforms

Adjacent stations

History
It was renamed to its present name on 1 April 1973. With the privatization of Japanese National Railways (JNR) on 1 April 1987, the station came under the control of JR West.

Passenger statistics
In fiscal 2016, the station was used by an average of 348 passengers daily (boarding passengers only).

Surrounding area
Nanjō Town Hall
Site of Somayama Castle
Nanjō Elementary School
Nanjō Junior High School

See also
 List of railway stations in Japan

References

External links

  

Railway stations in Fukui Prefecture
Stations of West Japan Railway Company
Railway stations in Japan opened in 1896
Hokuriku Main Line
Minamiechizen, Fukui